Ceride-i Havadis (Journal of News) was the first semi-official newspaper in the Ottoman Empire, and was published from 1840 to 1877.

History
Ceride-i Havadis was published by William Nosworthy Churchill, an Englishman who moved to Turkey aged 19 and was familiar with the Turkish language and the Ottoman Turkish script having worked as a translator at the American Consulate in Constantinople. Ceride-i Havadis published foreign news items translated by Churchill and his staff, provided by the Ottoman Government (Ottoman Imperial Printing House), wrote the news; and was the only semi-private paper in Turkey until 1860. The paper received financial support from the government and was first published on 31 July 1840. It was the first newspaper in the country to have private adverts and death notices.

To accommodate a growing circle of readers, the editors simplified the language in which the newspaper was written, gradually abandoning the more formal style which they had previously shared with the official Gazette. Ottoman statesman Said Pasha (1830–⁠1914), was at one time editor of the Ceridé-i-Havadis.

After Churchill’s death in 1846 he was succeeded by his son Alfred Black who went to Sevastopol during the Crimean War to cover the fighting for English newspapers, and his reports were also published in special supplements by the Ceride-i Havadis. In 1860 Alfred Churchill also established a daily version of the newspaper, :tr:Ruzname-i_Ceride-i_Havadis which was the first Turkish newspaper to be published on a daily basis during the Ottoman period. He promoted the cause of Turkish progress, and much improved the character of Turkish printing.

When the Sultan of Turkey visited England in July 1867, Alfred Black Churchill attended as the official historiographer.

After his death in 1870 aged 45, the business ran until 1887 when the papers closed.

Further reading
Orhan Koloğlu Encyclopedia of the Ottoman Empire, p431-434

References

External links

1840 establishments in the Ottoman Empire
1877 disestablishments in the Ottoman Empire
Defunct newspapers published in the Ottoman Empire
Newspapers published in Istanbul
Newspapers established in 1840
Publications disestablished in 1877
Former state media
Turkish-language newspapers